Banksia audax is a species of shrub that is endemic to Western Australia. It has fissured, grey bark, woolly stems, hairy, serrated leaves and golden orange flower spikes.

Description
It has fissured, grey bark and branches densely covered with woolly hairs.

Taxonomy and naming
Banksia audax was first formally described in 1928 by Charles Gardner from specimens he collected in 1926. Gardner gave it the specific name "audax", meaning "bold" in Latin, in recognition of its "boldness" in growing so far inland.

This shrub belongs to subgenus Banksia, section Banksia, series Cyrtostylis. It has no close relatives. B. benthamiana (Bentham's banksia) and B. laevigata (tennis ball banksia) are taxonomically closest to it, but these are both larger shrubs without lignotubers.

Distribution and habitat
Banksia audax occurs from near the town of Southern Cross, south almost to the coast. It occurs amongst heath and in mallee communities, growing in sandy yellow loam.

Conservation status
This banksia is classified as "not threatened" by the Western Australian Government Department of Parks and Wildlife.

Use in horticulture
Seeds do not require any treatment, and take 19 to 46 days to germinate.

References

audax
Eudicots of Western Australia
Plants described in 1928
Endemic flora of Western Australia